
Mount Brown is a mountain in the  Australian state  of South Australia located in the Flinders Ranges about  east of Port Augusta.

The mountain was named by the British navigator Matthew Flinders on 9 March 1802 after the Scottish botanist, Robert Brown, who was a member of ’s scientific team.  Brown along with others from HMS Investigator including Ferdinand Bauer and William Westall climbed the mountain on 10 and 11 March 1802.

Since 1993, it has been located within the boundaries of the protected area known as the Mount Brown Conservation Park.

The western side of the loop is part of the long distance walking trail, the Heysen Trail, which continues throughout the conservation park from the south to its trailhead at Parachilna Gorge.

See also
List of mountains in Australia

Citations and references

Citations

References

Brown
Brown